Maidan is an originally Persian word for a town square or public gathering place, used in many place names.

Maidan may refer to:

 Maidan (1982 film), a Pakistani Punjabi film
 Maidan Daily, an Urdu-language daily newspaper published in Peshawar, Pakistan

In Ukraine 

 Maidan Nezalezhnosti ("Independence Square"), a city square in Kyiv, Ukraine
 Euromaidan, a 2013–2014 series of protests "on the Maidan", centered around Maidan Nezalezhnosti
 Revolution of Dignity (the Maidan Revolution), the result of the Euromaidan protests
 Maidan (2014 film), a documentary film about the Maidan Uprising

See also 
 
 Majdan (disambiguation)
 Al Mayadeen, a pan-Arabist satellite television channel launched on 11 June 2012 in Beirut, Lebanon
 Al-Maydān, Egyptian weekly newspaper
 Bijapur Fort#Malik-e-Maidan, a cannon of the 16th century and artifact of the Old India